Olavi Antero Ahonen (January 31, 1941 – April 16, 1995) was a Finnish basketball player. 184 cm tall Ahonen played for Tampereen Pyrintö and Pispalan Tarmo in Korisliiga. Pyrintö has retired Ahonen's jersey but allowes players to use his number 7.

Ahonen had also 51 caps in Finland national basketball team and belonged to the Finnish squad in EuroBasket 1967 that achieved the sixth place, country's best position in men's international basketball competitions until then. With the national team he also won the Nordic championship in 1966.

Trophies and awards
 Jersey #7 retired by Tampereen Pyrintö
 Sixth place in EuroBasket 1967
 Nordic Championship 1966
 Finnish Cup 1969

References

External links
 
 
 

1941 births
1995 deaths
Tampereen Pyrintö players
Finnish men's basketball players
Sportspeople from Tampere